Alexander Stewart MacInnes (31 November 1850 – 20 June 1933) was a Gaelic-speaking Scottish Episcopalian priest in the "Non-juring Jacobite" tradition.

He was a native of Ballachulish, Scottish Highlands, and was educated at the University of Glasgow and Cumbrae Theological College. He was ordained deacon in 1888 and became a priest in 1891.

He was Rector of St Mary, Glencoe from 1889 to 1933 and Dean of Argyll and The Isles from 1930 to 1933.

References

Scottish Episcopalian clergy
Deans of Argyll and The Isles
1850 births
1933 deaths
Alumni of the University of Glasgow
People from Ballachulish